The Sheraton Princess Kaiulani Hotel is a large resort hotel in Honolulu, Hawaii.

The hotel is located on the site of ʻĀinahau, the royal estate of Princess Victoria Kaʻiulani, heir to the throne of the Kingdom of Hawaiʻi. The estate was demolished in 1925 by the owners of the Moana Hotel, located across Kalakaua Avenue, for the construction of wood frame bungalows for the hotel.

The bungalows were demolished in 1953 and the Matson Line constructed the Princess Kaiulani Hotel on the site, which opened on June 11, 1955. The 11-story building was the tallest in Hawaii at the time.

In 1959, Matson sold their hotels to Sheraton Hotels. Sheraton added a second wing to the successful Princess Kaiulani Hotel in 1960, the 210-room Diamond Head Wing. The hotel was sold to Kyo-Ya Company Limited in July 1963, though Sheraton continued to operate it. Kyo-Ya added a third wing, the 29-story Ainahau Tower, in 1970. Later in the 1970s, they renamed the hotel the Sheraton Princess Kaiulani.

References

External links

 

Hotels in Honolulu
Sheraton hotels
Hotels established in 1955
Hotel buildings completed in 1955
Hotel buildings completed in 1960
Hotel buildings completed in 1970
Buildings and structures completed in 1955
1955 establishments in Hawaii